Amos Kofi Nkrumah (born 29 March 1997) is a Ghanaian professional footballer who plays as a midfielder for Ghanaian Premier League side Ashanti Gold.

Career 
Nkrumah played for Karela United before moving on a 6-months loan deal to Cape Coast-based team Ebusua Dwarfs in May 2018. He featured in 3 league matches before the league was abandoned due to the dissolution of the GFA in June 2018, as a result of the Anas Number 12 Expose. In January 2019, he returned to Karela United. In early 2019, he moved to Obuasi-based team Ashanti Gold. He became a key member of their squad. He was a member of the club's squad that featured in the 2020–21 CAF Confederation Cup.

References

External links 

 
 

Living people
1997 births
Association football midfielders
Ghanaian footballers
Ghana Premier League players
Karela United FC players
Ebusua Dwarfs players
Ashanti Gold SC players